Keep Me Coming may refer to:

 "Keep Me Coming", a song by Superfruit on Future Friends (2017)
 "Keep Me Comin", a song by Kiss on Creatures of the Night (1982)
 "Keep Me Comin", the third album of Jesse Ed Davis (1973)